Incline Village is a census-designated place (CDP) on the north shore of Lake Tahoe in Washoe County, Nevada, United States. The population was 8,777 at the 2010 census. It is part of the Reno−Sparks Metropolitan Statistical Area. Until the 2010 census, the CDP Crystal Bay, Nevada was counted jointly with Incline Village.

Sierra Nevada University's main campus is located in Incline Village. It has some of the most expensive real estate in the United States.



History
Incline Village was established in 1882 with a post office opening February 7, 1884.

Sierra Nevada Wood and Lumber Company
The Sierra Nevada Wood and Lumber Company (SNW&L) was a logging company that operated on the northeast side of Lake Tahoe at what is today known as Incline Village, which was named after the SNW&L incline railway that served the area. Timber was required for the mines during the mining boom in the late 1800s of the nearby Comstock Lode in Virginia City. The timber around Lake Tahoe was placed on the incline railway where it was taken up  and then dropped by a gravity flume down the western side of mountain to a  tunnel to Carson City. The company operated a number of other railroad lines that were  narrow gauge and standard gauge.

Geography

Several creeks cross Incline Village on the way to Crystal Bay  in Lake Tahoe. Heading east from Stateline Point, these include First, Second and Third Creeks, then Incline Creek and finally Mill Creek at the eastern end.

Demographics

At the 2010 census, there were 8,777 people, 3,765 households and 2,335 families residing in the CDP. The racial make-up of the CDP was 86.9% White, 0.3% African American, 0.3% Native American, 2.2% Asian, 0.1% Pacific Islander, 8.1% some other race and 2.1% from two or more races. Hispanic or Latino of any race were 17.8% of the population.

There were 3,765 households, of which 21.9% had children under the age of 18 living with them, 53.4% were headed by married couples living together, 4.6% had a female householder with no husband present and 38.0% were non-families. 26.2% of all households were made up of individuals, and 8.0% were someone living alone who was 65 years of age or older. The average household size was 2.29 and the average family size was 2.74.

17.2% of the population were under the age of 18, 8.8% from 18 to 24, 23.0% from 25 to 44, 33.4% from 45 to 64 and 17.7% were 65 years of age or older. The median age was 45.7 years. For every 100 females there were 107.5 males. For every 100 females age 18 and over, there were 108.6 males.

Before 2010, the CDP was listed as "Incline Village–Crystal Bay, Nevada" by the U.S. Census Bureau. Crystal Bay, with a population of 305, became its own CDP for the 2010 census.

For the period 2007–2011, the estimated median household income in the CDP was $78,375 and the median family income  was $93,831. Males had a median income of $55,693 and females $47,993. The per capita income was $54,787. About 2.8% of families and 5.7% of the population were below the poverty line, including 3.1% of those under age 18 and 7.0% of those age 65 or over.

The largest industry is real estate with sales in excess of $1 billion in 2005. The median price for a single family residence in August 2019 was $1,300,000 and for a condo in 2010 was $335,000.

The local newspaper is the Tahoe Daily Tribune which is published on Fridays.

Climate
Incline Village has a humid continental climate (Dfb) with warm to hot summers with cool nights and moderately cold winters with frigid nights.

Education
The area is served by the Washoe County School District. Public schools in the CDP are Incline Elementary, Middl, and High School (public, K–12). The Lake Tahoe School is a private school for grades K–8.

The University of Nevada, Reno at Lake Tahoe, formerly Sierra Nevada University, is located in Incline. Lake Tahoe's only science museum and environmental research laboratories are operated by the UC Davis Tahoe Environmental Research Center in Incline Village.

Incline Village has a public library, a branch of the Washoe County Library.

Tax haven
The town is known as a haven for business and wealthy individuals from California and Southern Nevada. While some move to the village, others register shell corporations and residences there to avoid paying California taxes. A Montara, California, politician faced controversy for reporting Incline as her primary residence for tax purposes while also running for office in California.

Joe Francis, creator of "Girls Gone Wild", was registered as a resident in Incline but living in Los Angeles during the time he was found guilty of tax fraud and bribery. Michael DeDomenico, heir of the Rice-A-Roni and Ghirardelli fortune, was charged with evading $1.5 million in taxes to California by falsely claiming residency in Nevada. He owned homes in Verdi and Incline.

Notable residents
 Lloyd Bryan Molander Adams, director and producer
 Dale Brown, novelist, former U.S. Air Force pilot
 Warren Buffett, businessman, owned a home here in the 1980s
 Stu Cook, former bass guitarist for Creedence Clearwater Revival
 David Coverdale, founder/lead singer of Whitesnake and former lead singer of Deep Purple
 Trent Dilfer, former NFL quarterback and football analyst for NFL on Fox
 David Duffield, chairman of Workday, Inc., former chairman of PeopleSoft
 Larry Ellison, former CEO of Oracle Corporation, built a compound at the east end of Lakeshore Blvd.
 John Force, National Hot Rod Association (NHRA) Championship Funny Car driver
 Joe Francis, founder of Mantra Films, Inc. aka Girls Gone Wild
 Brent Jones, former Pro Bowl tight end for the San Francisco 49ers
 Jerome Lemelson, inventor and philanthropist
 Mike Love, lead singer of The Beach Boys
 Michael Milken, financier and philanthropist, pleaded guilty to securities and tax violations
 Bill Miller, Major League Baseball umpire
 Charles H. Moore, inventor of the Forth programming language
 Aaron Rodgers, quarterback for the Green Bay Packers
 George Seifert, former head coach for the San Francisco 49ers
 Annika Sörenstam, professional golfer
 Ken Wilber, author

See also

 List of census-designated places in Nevada

References

External links
 Incline Village Schools

Census-designated places in Nevada
Census-designated places in Washoe County, Nevada
Lake Tahoe
Reno, NV Metropolitan Statistical Area